Antic Hay is a comic novel by Aldous Huxley, published in 1923. The story takes place in London, and depicts the aimless or self-absorbed cultural elite in the sad and turbulent times following the end of World War I.

The book follows the lives of a diverse cast of characters in bohemian, artistic and intellectual circles, and has been called a "novel of ideas" rather than people.

It expresses a mood of mournful disenchantment and reinforced Huxley's reputation as an iconoclast. The book was condemned for its cynicism and for its immorality because of its open debate on sex. The novel was banned for a while in Australia and burned in Cairo.

Superficially the story follows one Theodore Gumbril in his invention of Gumbril's Patent Small-Clothes, trousers which contain a pneumatic cushion in the seat.

Gumbril's quest for love occasionally makes him resort to utilizing "The Complete Man" which is a disguise he concocts around a false full beard. With it he is able to overcome his shyness and approach women in public places with a bold directness. However he is then left with the problem of how he reveals his real self to the women he befriends.

It was written just after Huxley and his wife moved to Italy, where they lived from 1923 to 1927.

The title is from the play Edward II by Christopher Marlowe, c1593, Act One, Scene One, lines 59-60: "My men, like satyrs grazing on the lawns, shall with their goat feet dance the antic hay",  which is quoted on the frontispiece. "Antic hay", here,  refers to a playful dance. 
 
The manuscripts for the novel are part of the collection of the University of Houston Library.

The novel was mentioned briefly in Evelyn Waugh's classic novel Brideshead Revisited (1945):

References

As a Seminar topic at Flinders University, Australia
Huxley Bio at Valencia University, Spain
In Patrick Leigh Fermor's Between the Woods and the Water

External links

1923 British novels
Novels by Aldous Huxley
Roman à clef novels
Novels set in London
Chatto & Windus books